Jurong is a major geographical region located at the south-westernmost point of the West Region of Singapore. Although mostly vaguely defined, the region's extent roughly covers the planning areas of Jurong East, Jurong West, Boon Lay, and Pioneer, along with Jurong Island in the Western Islands cluster and the southernmost portions of the Western Water Catchment. Should it be described at its greatest historical extent, the region can also include present-day Bukit Batok and Tuas.

Jurong also covers several offshore islands as well, including Pulau Damar Laut and Pulau Samulun, both of which are located within the planning areas of Jurong East and Boon Lay respectively; along with the aforementioned Jurong Island. The coastline of the region on mainland Singapore, faces the strait of Selat Jurong, while the southernmost island of the region, Jurong Island, faces the strait of Selat Pandan.

Jurong was first developed and heavily industrialised in the late 1960s in response to the general economic situation of post-independence Singapore, and remains vital to the country's economic growth, either commercial, industrial and residential. The heavy redevelopment of the region paved the way for the opening of a large-scale industrial sector in the country, something which was unprecedented at that time. Today, Jurong has become one of the most densely-populated industrial areas in the country. Since the turn of the century, Jurong is envisioned to be the country's second central business district (CBD) as part of the Jurong Lake District project.

Etymology
"Jurong" took its name from Sungei Jurong, a river that still channels into Jurong Lake, the latter of which was created by damming the river itself.

Although its origins are disputed, the core definition of "Jurong", is probably derived from several meanings in Malay. The term could probably refer to the word for shark, "Jerung". It can also be derived from the word "Jurang" or a gorge. Jurong could also take its name from the word, "Penjuru", which roughly translates to, corner. Penjuru may most likely refer to the peninsula that sits between Sungei Jurong and Sungei Pandan. The native Malays named this peninsula, Tanjong Penjuru, which can be translated as Cape Corner in English. The present-day site of Tanjong Penjuru is now the subzone of Penjuru Crescent.

Geography

Pre-industrial Jurong

Landscape

Although Jurong's geography was documented on a few maps and records following Singapore's founding in 1819, the area only became clearer to the British in an 1828 geographical survey of the island by Lieutenant Philip Jackson. In a map that was drawn after the survey, the lieutenant clearly describes most of Jurong's natural geography with the two rivers of Jurong, Sungei Jurong and Sungei Pandan, marked on the map. He also noted down several islands which have since ceased to exist. Such islands include, Pulau Ayer Chawan, Pulau Butun, Pulau Pese (Pulau Pesek), Pulau Sakra and Pulau Saraya (Pulau Seraya), all of which have since merged to form Jurong Island. Current geographical landmarks such as Pulau Damar Laut and the strait of Selat Sembilan (now Selat Jurong) have also been included on the map.

The two rivers of Jurong were mentioned again in 1848, when a second survey conducted by John Turnbull Thomson, described the original shape and settlements of Sungei Jurong and Sungei Pandan. Turnbull describes both rivers as, "large creeks" with settlements around the both.

However, in the case of Sungei Jurong, Thomson gives his description as such:

Before the damming of Sungei Jurong, the present-day site of Jurong Lake was once occupied by two streams that split at the junction of the river. These two streams have since ceased to exist. However, like what Thomson said, these bodies of water roughly marked the present day locations of Jurong East and West, at that time identified as Jurong and Peng Kang on colonial era maps respectively.

Before its development in the 1960s, Jurong was left close to its pristine state after Singapore's founding in 1819. Although there were a few settlements around Jurong, most of the land was mainly uncharted territory. Swamps dominated the coastline of Jurong, yielding large amounts of wildlife such as mudskippers and horseshoe crabs. A forest reserve of dipterocarp trees would have once stood inland behind the grove of rhizophora trees along the coast. Low hills were mainly the highest elevated points around Jurong, although most of them were later levelled over the years.

This was evident, given the description made by Commodore Perry in his accounts of Jurong made during the Perry Expedition:

Territorial extent
In maps made by the British administration before Singapore's self-governance in 1959, the colonial era district (mukim) of Jurong was rather small, occupying what is today the present-day town of Bukit Batok and Tengah. Jurong Mukim was earlier known as West Bukit Timak Mukim, the renaming to Juong Mukim is probably with reference the Jurong settlement located at the head of Jurong River and also located at the south-west corner of this Mukim.  Other than that, most part of Jurong Mukim has very little historical basis for calling herself 'Jurong'.

Furthermore, many residents have often regarded the areas along the stretch of Jurong Road, especially the southern areas, as part of the extant of Jurong. Such areas include the colonial era districts (mukims) of Peng Kang (now Jurong West and Boon Lay), the southern portions of Choa Chu Kang (now Jurong West extension and NTU), Pandan (now split into Jurong East to the west and Clementi to the east) and Tuas (now Pioneer and the newly-reclaimed Tuas peninsula).

Modern Jurong

Ecology

Today, most of what is left of the original pristine Jurong is restricted to the areas around the Pandan Reservoir and Sungei Pandan. Little traces of the dipterocarp forest still remain. The mangrove swamps today are now just a fraction of its former self, located at the mouth of Sungei Pandan. The untouched mangrove fringes still hold the last remnants of wildlife in Jurong. It is because of this that area remains a hotspot for nature enthusiasts and bird watchers to this day.

Water bodies

Jurong is home to two prominent rivers, Sungei Jurong and Sungei Pandan, both of which flow into two larger water bodies, Jurong Lake and Pandan Reservoir respectively. The two rivers also source from Selat Jurong, a strait that faces south of mainland Singapore and north of Jurong Island.

The two rivers also have extensions that flow into the mainland portion of the region. Sungei Pandan has a western branch, Sungei Ulu Pandan, which flows from Jurong East into the town of Clementi before cutting off at Queenstown located east of Clementi. Sungei Jurong channels out of Jurong Lake via a stream located west of the lake and Jurong Canal located directly north of the lake. The canal also serves as the boundary line between the towns of Jurong East and West.

Elevation points
The highest elevation point in the region is Jurong Hill, which is located close to the centre of the industrial estate at Jurong (positioned north of Jurong Island) just adjacent to Jurong Bird Park.

Geology
Jurong's unique locale lends to itself a special rock formation unlike any other in Singapore. Named the Jurong Formation, the sedimentary rock deposits can trace its roots back to the late Triassic and early to middle Jurassic periods.

Territorial extent
The name "Jurong" is often used to collectively describe the region's five main planning areas. However, the URA does not officially recognise all of these places as a single territorial entity. Since the gazetting of the 1998 Master Plan, the Authority has officially classified Jurong as five individual separate planning areas. When Jurong is split into these five contiguous parts, it forms Jurong East and West in the north and north-west, Boon Lay and Pioneer to the south and south-west and Tuas to the extreme west of the region. Each of these individual areas can yet be further divided into subzones, smaller subdistricts that are a part of the larger planning area itself. If all five planning areas are combined, there would be a grand total of 34 subzones in Jurong.

The boundaries of modern-day Jurong were first demarcated in the 1960 proposal of the new town. The planned town was to be located entirely south of Jurong Road, combining land that was once the colonial era districts (mukims) of Peng Kang, Pandan and the southernmost portion of Choa Chu Kang. As a result of this proposal, the government gazetted portions of land from these areas to increase the overall size of Jurong. These boundaries were later further defined with the introduction of the URA 1991 Concept Plan in September 1991.

History

Before Raffles (c. 1600 – 1819)
The earliest known significance of Jurong can be traced back to 1595 on a maritime documentation of oriental trading routes. Titled "Reys-gheschrift van de Navigation der Portugaloysers in Orienten", the journal written by Dutch author Jan Huyghen van Linschoten, names a certain "Selat Sembilan" that one must cross eastwards after reaching the southernmost end of the Strait of Malacca. This suggests that the straits near Jurong witnessed a significant role in the ancient maritime Silk Road. Although not mapped by Linschoten, the location of Selat Sembilan was later identified in Philip Jackson's 1828 survey of Singapore. Despite much land-reclamation works along most coastal parts of Jurong and Tuas, Selat Sembilan still exists today as Selat Jurong, stretching along the entire coastline of the region.

Even before the arrival of Sir Stamford Raffles in 1819, small settlements had already been built along Jurong's coastal areas as well as the present-day site of Jurong Island, Pulau Damar Laut and Pulau Sembulan. Such squatters were inhabited by the native Orang laut, and there also immigrants from the nearby Dutch East Indies and Malaya.

Colonial era (1819 to 1942)

Earliest developments
Post-colonization, Jurong had a small population of inhabitants scattered along the banks of the area's two main rivers, Sungei Jurong and Sungei Pandan. It consisted mainly of a large Chinese and Malay migrant population.

The majority of the Chinese population was Hokkien-speaking, immigrating from Anxi County in the province of Fujian, China. A Teochew demographic was also prevalent in Jurong. Originating from the City of Jieyang, the Teochew-speaking population mainly settled along the westernmost portions of Jurong.

Most of the Malays and Orang Laut in the area were natives of the land, settling in squatters and villages located along the coast of Jurong long before the founding of Singapore as a British colony in 1819. There were also other ethnic Malay groups that came down from the rest of the Malay Archipelago who migrated from various parts of present-day Malaysia and Indonesia. However, the exact statistics concerning foreign Malays settling in Jurong after 1819 is not clear.

In a visit to the area in 1848, the then-Chief Surveyor of Singapore, John Turnbull Thomson, made one of the earliest accounts regarding human settlements in Jurong.

He described the demographics along Sungei Jurong as such:

Thomson also gave his description on the population along Sungei Pandan:

With the increase in population size over the years, the need for a mode of travel to and from the Town of Singapore, was necessary. Between 1852 and 1853, the first few portions of Jurong Road were paved to connect villages around Jurong to the metropolitan areas of Singapore Town and the rest of the island. This first portion of Jurong Road started from the seventh milestone of Bukit Timah Road ending along the head of Sungei Jurong. Although it isn't known when the rest of the road was paved, by 1936, the road stretched up to the district of Tuas.

An American expedition

In 1853, US Navy Commodore Matthew C. Perry led a maritime expedition to Japan in an attempt to open up the country (then under self-imposed isolation) to the world for trade and the possible building of political and economic ties.

The fleet of the Perry Expedition stopped over at a few countries before reaching the Japanese archipelago. One of the few docking locations during the trip was Singapore. This made it the second time that the United States had made a diplomatic presence on the island since the Exploring Expedition.

Perry's crew anchored their fleet of two frigates and two sloops-of-war along Selat Sembilan and Sungei Jurong, where they surveyed the surroundings of the strait and the river.

Wilhelm Heine and Eliphalet Brown, two of the official expedition's artists, were tasked at producing a lithograph depicting the villages along Sungei Jurong. The resulting image was one of the earliest illustrations of colonial-era Jurong.

The interesting point of the image is the scene of a forest fire shown in the background. This was common at the time as such raging wildfires were often rampant and common throughout most of Jurong in the mid-19th century. Another point worthy of note in the image is the United States flag seen affixed on the stern of the sampan in the foreground.

Earliest industries

Agriculture and aquaculture
Before the early 1960s, small and large plantations alike dominated the area, which produced and harvested crops such as pineapple, pepper, gambier and nutmeg, thus providing key sources of income for the people of the district. However, in the early period of time, the main produce for export by the plantations of Jurong was gambier. Gambier's practical uses and medicinal properties made the plant-crop significantly valuable and gambier plantations proved to become profitable for the Chinese kangchu-owners situated in the area, the local communities and other local and foreign plantation owners. In 1855, the Municipal Committee of the British colonial government reported that there were 20 of such legally-recognised gambier plantations existing within Jurong. However, this figure is not entirely accurate given the fact that many illegal ones were also set up in the area.

Rubber was also a popular agricultural industry in Jurong at that time and was regarded as a strong competitor to the gambier plantation businesses and firms that were flourishing and expanding in the district. By the first half of the 20th century, the practices of rubber-tapping and the setting up of rubber plantations overtook the role of planting and harvesting gambier, an agricultural activity that once thrived in Jurong. A notable example of a business dealing in gambier that shifted to the rubber-plantation sector was the plantation firm that belonged to Chinese business-magnate Chew Boon Lay. The large amount of land that his plantation stood on was often well-associated with his name. Today, this area is known as Boon Lay Place and is a small subzone that is enclaved within the new town of Jurong West.

Aside from the profitable reliance on cash-crops and large plantations, fishing was also another prominent form of income for the locals staying in Jurong, although this job aspect was mostly handled and dealt with by the local Malay and Orang Laut population, most of whom chose to live along the coastlines of Jurong or had already settled there for many generations. Fishing was also conducted along the two of the more prominent rivers of Jurong at Sungei Jurong and Sungei Pandan respectively.

Numerous prawn farms were also set up along these two rivers where such crustacean species naturally thrived. By the 1950s, 500 acres of land in Jurong was specifically designated for prawn-farming in Jurong. This was roughly half of the total amount of land used for prawn farms located all over Singapore at that time.

Manufacturing and processing
For some time before the period of rapid industrialisation occurring in Jurong throughout the 1960s, Jurong was already a host to several businesses in the heavy industry (primarily dealing with construction and manufacturing), most notably, the brickwork industrial sector. Local businesses involving in brick manufacturing and earthenware production were largely set up around Yunnan in Jurong West, where the soil conditions there could yield much clay and terracotta. Although almost all of these factories and industries closed down over the years (most were shut down by the late 1990s and early 2000s), the brickwork industry remains strong (primarily in the form of its past and its legacy) in Jurong even to this day.

The earliest brick factories in Jurong emerged in the 1920s and exported large quantities of the building material to construction sites around Singapore as well as to Malaya (now Malaysia), with a notable brick factory in the area being the Jurong Brickworks. First set up in the 1930s, Jurong Brickworks was one of the largest privately owned brick manufacturers and suppliers in Singapore. During the company's heyday and booming peak all throughout the 1970s, it manufactured more than three million bricks every month. Jurong Brickworks was eventually shut down in 2005 and the entire manufacturing plant was demolished in that same year as well.

Another notable earthenware-production business located in Jurong is the Thow Kwang Dragon Kiln. Set up by Chinese immigrants in the 1940s, this pottery manufacturer, along with its neighbouring counterpart, the Jalan Bahar Clay Studios, continues to exist to this day and remain as the only possessor of a pair of dragon kilns in Singapore. Although located in an area that is traditionally a part of Jurong, the kilns are technically located next to Nanyang Technological University, which is situated in the Western Water Catchment.

Similar business ventures
Aside from his plantation, Chew Boon Lay also owned one of the earliest factories (a manufacturing plant) that was located in Jurong. During its time in business-operation from 1950 to 1958, the manufacturing plant produced a wide range of canned goods (foodstuff) that ranged from kaya to curry and even peanut butter. It was located along Jalan Ahmad Ibrahim and was opposite from the location of where Jurong Bird Park is located at now. This same building was also a temporary location for the management offices of the Jurong Town Corporation in 1968.

Second World War (1941–45)

101 Special Training School

Following the invasion of Thailand in the beginning of December in 1941, the Imperial Japanese Army was rapidly heading southwards down the Malay Peninsula towards Singapore. It was rather obvious, by then, to many that a Japanese military assault on the island was nearly imminent. In light of the oncoming threat, the Oriental Mission of the UK's Special Operations Executive chose to set up a training institution/school in Singapore to assist and train members of possible anti-Japanese resistance movements throughout Japanese-occupied British Malaya and, later, Singapore.

One proposed site for the training base was at Pulau Ubin. However, the suggestion was dropped for a number of reasons. Issues such as the difficulty of clearing thick jungle foliage, the cost of building and developing the training base's site, the lack of access to freshwater and the risk of contagious malaria and other diseases made Pulau Ubin unsuitable for a possible location. Later on, during the formation of Singapore Armed Forces, the proposed site for the training bases are located at Pasir Laba and Pulau Tekong respectively. Pasir Laba was the first to be built during the formation of SAF, and set up the live firing zone in the west. Pulau Tekong was the second to be built.

The SOE eventually settled on a small and isolated island known as Tanjong Balai. Located at the mouth of Sungei Jurong, the island was where a single man-made structure, consisting of a lone bungalow that was once owned by Jewish businessman Joseph Brook David, was located. Apart from the bungalow, the island was also well-hidden amongst the canopy of secondary-type rainforest and what was even better was the convenience of accessing the location either by a boat or by a well-hidden path in the jungle.

With the SOE's settling down at Tanjong Balai, the Number 101 Special Training School was created and mainly trained its personnel in the various fields of sabotage, reconnaissance and espionage to prepare them for resistance efforts against Japanese occupation forces.

With the invading Japanese military pushing into Singapore by February in 1942, the training base was quickly closed down with the destruction of related documents and the abandonment of the training base Tanjong Balai. A new SOE training base was later established in Burma in the former capital city of Myanmar at Rangoon.

Today, the island of Tanjong Balai and the training base located there is largely unheard-of by many modern-day Singaporeans. The island has since been subsumed by Jurong Port after further land-reclamation works were carried out in the 1980s to expand the harbour.

Modern history (1960–present)

The need to industrialise
Post-war Singapore was plagued with much economic and financial trouble. A largely-uneducated population and the then-chronic lack of jobs meant that the amount of available manpower in the country was quite scarce. By the end of the decade of the 1950s, the total unemployment rate in post-war Singapore stood at about 14%, which encompassed an estimated 200,000 people out of the whole population at that time. To add on to the problems of widespread unemployment and the subsequent general poverty of the people that followed, the government had to tackle the issue of the then-high birth-rate in the country, which increased every year by around 4%.

With the Cold War already present and the then-constant threat of communism spreading from Malaya, the country's Legislative Assembly was being pressured to keep the British-ruled crown colony financially stable and economically strong.

In 1959, the People's Action Party emerged victorious in the first general election held in a self-governing Singapore. A crucial element of the party's agenda shortly after coming to power was the promise of more and better employment opportunities and jobs for the people and the need to build up and strengthen the weak economy of a newly-developing self-governing nation. Thus, the new PAP-led government had a desperate and urgent need to resolve the issue of Singapore's weak economy and Dr Goh Keng Swee, then the finance minister of Singapore, was quickly put in charge of this challenging task.

Dr Goh determined that the only way to improve and strengthen Singapore's weak economy was through industrialisation. He envisioned a major industrial town in Singapore that would have modern industries mainly based in the manufacturing sector, such as shipyards, steelworks, chemical plants and other factories. Although such an idea was not the first of its kind, Dr Goh's plans for an industrial estate in Jurong were much more ambitious and wider-reaching than other previously-made proposals.

Jurong Industrial Estate

On the 4th of July in 1960, the Legislative Assembly of Singapore announced a proposal to construct a new industrial town in Jurong. The entire project, which totalled $45.7 million in cost, begun almost immediately after the proposal's announcement, with the immediate processes of planning and designing taking place in August in that same year.

For Jurong's industrialisation, with Singapore's request for assistance with regard to economic development, the United Nations Industrial Survey Mission designated Dutch economic/financial advisor Dr Albert Winsemius to take charge of the project for the economic development of Singapore. The same UN mission also deployed Frenchman Mr P. Schereschewsky to survey Jurong's suitability for an industrial town.

In 1961, the Economic and Development Board (the EDB) was formed to spearhead Singapore's industrialisation and earthworks for the construction and development of Jurong's industrial estate began in that same year. A year later, in 1962, the then-finance minister of Singapore, Dr Goh Keng Swee, helped to lay and set the foundation stone for the newly established National Iron and Steel Mills, the first factory in the new industrial estate (the factory has since been renamed to become NatSteel and the company is now a subsidiary of Tata Steel of India). At that time, many Singaporeans doubted the chances of success concerning Dr Goh's ambitious plan to develop the area for industrialisation and gave it the unflattering nickname of "Goh's Folly". They were quickly proven wrong, however, as 24 factories (of various types) were soon established in 1963. In May 1965, Jurong Port became operational.

In 1968, the Jurong Town Corporation was created to direct and manage of Jurong's development. By this time, a total of 14.78 square-kilometres of industrial land had been prepared with 153 factories fully functioning and being up-and-running and 46 more being constructed and set up. With Singapore's economy constantly growing and developing ever more rapidly, finding more space for newer businesses and industries in the future is an ever-present and constant challenge. Seven islets off the southern coast of Jurong were merged to create the 30 square-kilometre Jurong Island, which is where most of the oil, chemical and petrochemical factories, manufacturing industries and plants in Singapore are located at. The construction and development of Jurong Island began in the early part of the 1990s and is scheduled to be completed by 2010 (as of 2016, much of the development works have been completed, with some newer developments about to commence or are still ongoing). A number of heavy-type industrial companies and firms, such as DuPont and Teijin Polycarbonate, amongst others, began their business operations there in the later part of the 1990s. The Jurong Island Causeway provides the only land-based link to Jurong Island from mainland Singapore.  All forms of access to the island is heavily restricted ever since the September 11 attacks in 2001. An entry/exit security pass is required for all employees working at Jurong Island and cameras and all other recording equipment are banned from being transported into the island.

Townships of Jurong

The first few low-rise flats in Jurong Town emerged in the precinct of Taman Jurong between 1963 and 1964, developed by the Housing and Development Board. Around this time, other notable housing estates, such as Boon Lay, began breaking ground as well. Despite the new residential developments, Jurong lacked a growing population. Reasons were largely due to the location of Jurong and the lack of infrastructure around the region at the time.

The development of Jurong East and West started in the 1979 when estates such as Taman Jurong, Boon Lay Place, Bukit Batok, Bukit Gombak, Hong Kah, Teban Gardens and Yuhua were built, mostly due to the resettlement of Hong Kah and surrounding villages. Boon Lay Place, Taman Jurong and Hong Kah formed Jurong West New Town. Yuhua, Teban Gardens, Bukit Batok and Bukit Gombak formed Jurong East New Town.

In 1982, Jurong West New Town started expanding as Jurong West Extension, which saw the realignment of the PIE to make it go through the southern boundary of present-day NTU, while converting the former section into Jurong West Avenue 2 and renaming the original Upper Jurong Road into Jurong West Avenue 4. Pioneer Road was extended North wards from present-day Upper Jurong Road as Pioneer Road North to the new PIE exit, which signalled the start of the development of Jurong West Extension (Yunnan, Pioneer and Gek Poh). The N9 estate was the first to be built and the N6 estate was the last, in the early 2000s. The MRT Line was extended from Lakeside to Boon Lay in 1990 and again to Pioneer in 2009.

Spyros disaster

On 12 October 1978, a Greek oil tanker, Spyros, exploded at Jurong Shipyard, killing more than 70 people in the immediate vicinity. The result was one of the worst man-made disasters/calamities since the Second World War in Singapore and the worst industrial accident since the country gained full independence in 1965.

Infrastructure

Transportation

Private
Jurong is well connected to the rest of Singapore by road, with Kranji Expressway linking them to the northern part of Singapore, Pan Island Expressway linking them to the Eastern part of Singapore and the Ayer Rajah Expressway linking them to the south-eastern part of Singapore. Clementi Avenue 6 and Jurong Town Hall Road complement the 3 expressways, topping off the well-built road connection from Jurong to all parts of the island.

Mass Rapid Transit (MRT)

The region is well-connected to the MRT system with Jurong East and Chinese Garden serving Jurong East. Lakeside, Boon Lay and Pioneer serving Jurong West and Joo Koon , Gul Circle , Tuas West Road, Tuas Link serving Pioneer & Tuas industrial areas.

In the future, the 20-kilometre Jurong Region MRT Line will help to further connect commuters to places in Jurong and the rest of Singapore.

Bus
Jurong is served by public bus services originating from 4 interchanges and 1 bus depot, namely the Jurong East , Boon Lay , Joo Koon & Tuas bus interchanges and Soon Lee Bus Depot.

Economy

Commercial

The more notable shopping malls in Jurong are Jurong Point Shopping Mall in Pioneer and IMM in Yuhua.

The largest suburban mall in Singapore, Jurong Point Shopping Mall is well-accessible by bus services from all the residential precincts of Jurong except Yuhua and Teban Gardens. This mall targets young adults and families with stalls selling fashion, food and beverages, sports, entertainment and lifestyle products. It also serves the elderly population with body-wellness stores and healthcare centres located at level 4 and 5 of the mall. It is well linked to the Boon Lay MRT station and Boon Lay Bus Interchange.

The largest outlet mall in Singapore, IMM is located within walking distance and visible from Jurong East MRT station. The mall contains a Kopitiam food court on Level 3, many furniture stores and other retail stores. These include a Popular Bookstore, one of Singapore's largest distributors of print and stationery products, and a Daiso department store, which sells decorative items and lifestyle products at low prices. There is a Giant Hypermarket at level 1 of the mall. A free shuttle bus service that ferries visitors to the mall from JCube & Westgate malls (near to Jurong East MRT Station) has stopped operations since 1 January 2017. It has been replaced by J-walk,  a pedestrian network that connects shopping malls and hospitals to the Jurong East MRT Station.

There are other shopping malls in Jurong, but are only well known within the precinct they are located in. Such malls include Hong Kah Point in Hong Kah and Taman Jurong Shopping Centre in Taman Jurong.

Tourism

Singapore Science Centre
Snow City
Singapore Discovery Centre
Singapore Army Museum
Jurong Bird Park (to be ceased and relocated to Mandai by 2023)
Jurong Lake Gardens
ABC Waters @ Jurong Lake (largest man-made floating wetlands with a total area of 3,850 sqm)

Education
Jurong Junior College is located within the region, in between Hong Kah and Boon Lay, although it was closed in 2019.  There is at least 1 primary school and 1 secondary school in each precinct of Jurong including the Shuqun Primary School established in 1925 in Jurong West. Additionally, River Valley High School is located within Boon Lay, in close proximity to Jurong Point.

Politics
Jurong used to be an independent political constituency in the 1959 general elections. Chia Thye Poh represented the constituency in parliament between 1963 and 1966. Then, Boon Lay Constituency was carved out in 1976 and Hong Kah Constituency in 1984, forming four separate constituencies. Hong Kah Constituency eventually became a GRC that consisted of Nanyang, Hong Kah, Gek Poh and Bukit Batok in 1988. Teban Gardens, Pioneer, Yuhua and Taman Jurong were under Bukit Timah Constituency and the N9 region of Nanyang was under Jurong Constituency all that while.

In 2001, there were major changes in the political constituencies of Jurong. Boon Lay Constituency, together with Teban Gardens and Pioneer, were absorbed into the expanded West Coast GRC. Hong Kah Constituency was re-designed to include towns of Chua Chu Kang (Limbang and Yew Tee) and Bukit Gombak and only Nanyang and Gek Poh remained in the constituency, this time including the N9 region of Nanyang. Jurong Constituency was abolished. Hong Kah and Bukit Batok were regrouped into the newly created Jurong GRC, along with Yuhua and Taman Jurong. As such, the entire political system of Jurong was changed with 3 GRCs as a result.

10 years later, in 2011, Gek Poh, Yuhua and Pioneer were crafted out from each of the three GRCs to become SMCs. In total, there are now six constituencies in Jurong.

Nonetheless, though divided into six separate constituencies, all the precincts are collectively managed by the PAP and known as Jurong.

References

Notes

Sources

External links

Southwest CDC Website

 
West Region, Singapore
New towns in Singapore
Industrial estates in Singapore
Places in Singapore